"Shuckatoom" is theme music written by James R. Kirk for Casey Kasem's weekly radio program, American Top 40.

Initially, the jingles and music beds were created by PAMS, a radio jingle company from Dallas, Texas. The company suspended operations in 1978, by which time AT40’s production company, Watermark Inc., had contracted with JAM Creative Productions, also out of Dallas, for their show jingles and themes. Several years beyond that, ABC/Watermark teamed up with composer Jim Kirk (who composed the very first AT40 theme in 1970), and through Jim Kirk and TM Century, yet another jingle house, they obtained the jingles and themes that took AT40 through the late 1980s.

Although the cue sheets that listed the "Shuckatoom" theme indicated it was published by Markwater Music and licensed through BMI, the tune was never made available separate from the show itself. Only by owning a copy of the correct show would anyone be able to obtain an "in the clear" copy of the show themes.

The "Shuckatoom" theme, in its entirety without Kasem's voice-over, can be found on several AT40 shows; its use to close the show was used starting with the "Top 40 Rock & Roll Acts of the 1950s" special on October 4, 1975, and first used to open AT40 on November 8, 1975.

The "Shuckatoom" theme was last used to open the show hosted by Charlie Van Dyke on January 7, 1984. The following week when Casey returned, a new theme was used.

References

American Top 40
Radio theme songs